The 1986–87 Philadelphia Flyers season was the Philadelphia Flyers' 20th season in the National Hockey League (NHL). The Flyers reached the Stanley Cup Finals but lost to the Edmonton Oilers in seven games.

Regular season
With the previous Spring's upset loss to the Rangers fresh on their minds, the Flyers got off to a 6–0–0 start to the season, and only lost road games to the Islanders and Penguins in an 8–2–0 October.

Goaltender Ron Hextall made his professional debut on opening night, October 9, and held Edmonton to one goal in a 2–1 victory, and only improved from there, being named NHL Rookie of the Month for October and November.

Things began to click for the club as a whole in November as Brad McCrimmon returned from his suspension over a contract dispute and the emergence of Hextall forced Bob Froese into a back-up role. In the first two months of the season, only the Penguins challenged the Flyers' grip on the top spot in the division, actually starting the year 7–0–0 and topping Philly on October 25 but fading by the end of November.

Brian Propp scored four goals in a 7–1 win over St. Louis on December 2, but three games later he was lost for two months after suffering a serious knee injury against the Oilers. Froese was dealt to the New York Rangers for Kjell Samuelsson on December 18 and later that same night routing the Islanders 9–4 which saw Poulin and Kerr record three-goal games. The record reached 25–7–2 on December 21 after a 7–6 comeback win over the Blues, but during the next game in Buffalo, Ilkka Sinisalo went down with a knee injury and the team lost four in a row on a holiday road trip (Sabres, Canucks, Oilers, Kings).

A seven-game unbeaten streak in January put the Flyers at 31–11–3, three points ahead of the Oilers for best record in the NHL, but injuries began to put a strain on the ranks.  With Propp, Sinisalo, Mark Howe, and Ron Sutter all suffering through long-term problems, plus minor injuries cropping up, the team sputtered late, going 15–15–5 over the remainder of the schedule.

February 1 saw the Flyers routed 8–4 in Toronto, part of another four-game losing string before the break for Rendez-vous '87. Home defeats to the Rangers (6–1 on March 12), Kings (5–2 on March 19) and Detroit (5–1 on March 28) followed. A 9–5 home loss on the season's final day to the New York Islanders was no indication of the memorable playoff run to come.

Twice within a span of one week in late January, the Flyers engaged in bench-clearing brawls. The first came in a 3–1 loss to the Islanders at home on January 18 which cost head coach Keenan a one-game suspension. Oddly enough, the second occurred during the game Keenan was suspended for, a 4–3 setback to the Devils at the Meadowlands January 24. That fracas, which came after the final buzzer, saw Hextall pummel Devils goaltender Alain Chevrier among several other battles.

The Flyers captured a third-straight Patrick Division title and Hextall became the third Flyers goaltender to win the Vezina, joining Bernie Parent and Pelle Lindbergh.

Season standings

Playoffs
The Flyers gained revenge on the New York Rangers by beating them in six games, as well as surviving a tough seven-game test from a gritty New York Islanders club. By the time the Flyers defeated the defending Stanley Cup champion Montreal Canadiens in six to win the Wales Conference and return to the Stanley Cup Finals, the Flyers had again been decimated by injuries, including losing Tim Kerr for the remainder of the playoffs. As a result, the Flyers lost in heartbreaking fashion to the Edmonton Oilers in seven tough, hard-fought games. Hextall was voted playoff MVP, the second such time a Flyer won the Conn Smythe Trophy despite being on the losing team, the other being Reggie Leach in 1976.

Schedule and results

Regular season

|- style="background:#cfc;"
| 1 || October 9 || Edmonton Oilers || 2–1 || 1–0–0 || 2 || 
|- style="background:#cfc;"
| 2 || October 11 || @ Washington Capitals || 6–1 || 2–0–0 || 4 || 
|- style="background:#cfc;"
| 3 || October 16 || Vancouver Canucks || 6–2 || 3–0–0 || 6 || 
|- style="background:#cfc;"
| 4 || October 18 || @ Hartford Whalers || 6–3 || 4–0–0 || 8 || 
|- style="background:#cfc;"
| 5 || October 19 || Winnipeg Jets || 3–1 || 5–0–0 || 10 || 
|- style="background:#cfc;"
| 6 || October 23 || Pittsburgh Penguins || 5–3 || 6–0–0 || 12 || 
|- style="background:#fcf;"
| 7 || October 25 || @ Pittsburgh Penguins || 2–4 || 6–1–0 || 12 || 
|- style="background:#cfc;"
| 8 || October 26 || Minnesota North Stars || 4–1 || 7–1–0 || 14 || 
|- style="background:#fcf;"
| 9 || October 28 || @ New York Islanders || 1–2 || 7–2–0 || 14 || 
|- style="background:#cfc;"
| 10 || October 30 || Quebec Nordiques || 6–3 || 8–2–0 || 16 || 
|-

|- style="background:#cfc;"
| 11 || November 1 || Boston Bruins || 4–2 || 9–2–0 || 18 || 
|- style="background:#cfc;"
| 12 || November 4 || New Jersey Devils || 7–1 || 10–2–0 || 20 || 
|- style="background:#ffc;"
| 13 || November 6 || @ New Jersey Devils || 5–5 OT || 10–2–1 || 21 || 
|- style="background:#fcf;"
| 14 || November 8 || New York Rangers || 2–3 || 10–3–1 || 21 || 
|- style="background:#cfc;"
| 15 || November 13 || Detroit Red Wings || 7–5 || 11–3–1 || 23 || 
|- style="background:#fcf;"
| 16 || November 14 || @ New York Rangers || 1–2 || 11–4–1 || 23 || 
|- style="background:#cfc;"
| 17 || November 16 || Washington Capitals || 6–2 || 12–4–1 || 25 || 
|- style="background:#ffc;"
| 18 || November 19 || @ Toronto Maple Leafs || 2–2 OT || 12–4–2 || 26 || 
|- style="background:#cfc;"
| 19 || November 20 || Chicago Blackhawks || 5–1 || 13–4–2 || 28 || 
|- style="background:#cfc;"
| 20 || November 22 || Toronto Maple Leafs || 6–1 || 14–4–2 || 30 || 
|- style="background:#cfc;"
| 21 || November 26 || Montreal Canadiens || 4–2 || 15–4–2 || 32 || 
|- style="background:#cfc;"
| 22 || November 28 || @ Washington Capitals || 4–2 || 16–4–2 || 34 || 
|- style="background:#cfc;"
| 23 || November 29 || @ New York Islanders || 6–5 || 17–4–2 || 36 || 
|-

|- style="background:#cfc;"
| 24 || December 2 || St. Louis Blues || 7–1 || 18–4–2 || 38 || 
|- style="background:#fcf;"
| 25 || December 4 || Hartford Whalers || 1–2 || 18–5–2 || 38 || 
|- style="background:#fcf;"
| 26 || December 6 || @ Boston Bruins || 0–5 || 18–6–2 || 38 || 
|- style="background:#cfc;"
| 27 || December 7 || Edmonton Oilers || 5–2 || 19–6–2 || 40 || 
|- style="background:#cfc;"
| 28 || December 9 || Vancouver Canucks || 6–3 || 20–6–2 || 42 || 
|- style="background:#cfc;"
| 29 || December 11 || Calgary Flames || 5–3 || 21–6–2 || 44 || 
|- style="background:#fcf;"
| 30 || December 13 || @ Minnesota North Stars || 4–5 || 21–7–2 || 44 || 
|- style="background:#cfc;"
| 31 || December 14 || @ Winnipeg Jets || 4–1 || 22–7–2 || 46 || 
|- style="background:#cfc;"
| 32 || December 18 || New York Islanders || 9–4 || 23–7–2 || 48 || 
|- style="background:#cfc;"
| 33 || December 20 || @ Pittsburgh Penguins || 6–4 || 24–7–2 || 50 || 
|- style="background:#cfc;"
| 34 || December 21 || St. Louis Blues || 7–6 || 25–7–2 || 52 || 
|- style="background:#fcf;"
| 35 || December 23 || @ Buffalo Sabres || 1–2 || 25–8–2 || 52 || 
|- style="background:#fcf;"
| 36 || December 27 || @ Vancouver Canucks || 2–4 || 25–9–2 || 52 || 
|- style="background:#fcf;"
| 37 || December 28 || @ Edmonton Oilers || 4–6 || 25–10–2 || 52 || 
|- style="background:#fcf;"
| 38 || December 30 || @ Los Angeles Kings || 1–4 || 25–11–2 || 52 || 
|-

|- style="background:#cfc;"
| 39 || January 3 || @ Washington Capitals || 4–1 || 26–11–2 || 54 || 
|- style="background:#cfc;"
| 40 || January 6 || New Jersey Devils || 4–0 || 27–11–2 || 56 || 
|- style="background:#cfc;"
| 41 || January 7 || @ New York Rangers || 6–3 || 28–11–2 || 58 || 
|- style="background:#cfc;"
| 42 || January 10 || @ Boston Bruins || 5–4 || 29–11–2 || 60 || 
|- style="background:#ffc;"
| 43 || January 11 || Washington Capitals || 2–2 OT || 29–11–3 || 61 || 
|- style="background:#cfc;"
| 44 || January 15 || Montreal Canadiens || 6–3 || 30–11–3 || 63 || 
|- style="background:#cfc;"
| 45 || January 17 || @ New York Islanders || 4–2 || 31–11–3 || 65 || 
|- style="background:#fcf;"
| 46 || January 18 || New York Islanders || 1–3 || 31–12–3 || 65 || 
|- style="background:#ffc;"
| 47 || January 21 || @ Chicago Blackhawks || 5–5 OT || 31–12–4 || 66 || 
|- style="background:#cfc;"
| 48 || January 23 || Chicago Blackhawks || 4–3 || 32–12–4 || 68 || 
|- style="background:#fcf;"
| 49 || January 24 || @ New Jersey Devils || 3–4 || 32–13–4 || 68 || 
|- style="background:#cfc;"
| 50 || January 28 || @ Buffalo Sabres || 7–4 || 33–13–4 || 70 || 
|- style="background:#cfc;"
| 51 || January 29 || Pittsburgh Penguins || 5–3 || 34–13–4 || 72 || 
|- style="background:#fcf;"
| 52 || January 31 || New York Rangers || 1–3 || 34–14–4 || 72 || 
|-

|- style="background:#fcf;"
| 53 || February 2 || @ Toronto Maple Leafs || 4–8 || 34–15–4 || 72 || 
|- style="background:#fcf;"
| 54 || February 4 || @ Winnipeg Jets || 3–5 || 34–16–4 || 72 || 
|- style="background:#fcf;"
| 55 || February 7 || @ New Jersey Devils || 2–3 || 34–17–4 || 72 || 
|- style="background:#cfc;"
| 56 || February 14 || @ St. Louis Blues || 4–2 || 35–17–4 || 74 || 
|- style="background:#fcf;"
| 57 || February 16 || Calgary Flames || 0–5 || 35–18–4 || 74 || 
|- style="background:#cfc;"
| 58 || February 17 || @ New York Islanders || 3–2 || 36–18–4 || 76 || 
|- style="background:#ffc;"
| 59 || February 19 || Pittsburgh Penguins || 4–4 OT || 36–18–5 || 77 || 
|- style="background:#cfc;"
| 60 || February 21 || @ Los Angeles Kings || 4–2 || 37–18–5 || 79 || 
|- style="background:#fcf;"
| 61 || February 26 || @ Calgary Flames || 3–4 || 37–19–5 || 79 || 
|-

|- style="background:#fcf;"
| 62 || March 1 || @ Minnesota North Stars || 4–5 || 37–20–5 || 79 || 
|- style="background:#cfc;"
| 63 || March 3 || Buffalo Sabres || 4–2 || 38–20–5 || 81 || 
|- style="background:#cfc;"
| 64 || March 5 || Washington Capitals || 4–2 || 39–20–5 || 83 || 
|- style="background:#fcf;"
| 65 || March 7 || @ Hartford Whalers || 3–5 || 39–21–5 || 83 || 
|- style="background:#cfc;"
| 66 || March 8 || New Jersey Devils || 7–3 || 40–21–5 || 85 || 
|- style="background:#cfc;"
| 67 || March 11 || @ New Jersey Devils || 6–4 || 41–21–5 || 87 || 
|- style="background:#fcf;"
| 68 || March 12 || New York Rangers || 1–6 || 41–22–5 || 87 || 
|- style="background:#ffc;"
| 69 || March 14 || @ Montreal Canadiens || 3–3 OT || 41–22–6 || 88 || 
|- style="background:#cfc;"
| 70 || March 15 || @ New York Rangers || 5–2 || 42–22–6 || 90 || 
|- style="background:#cfc;"
| 71 || March 17 || New York Rangers || 4–1 || 43–22–6 || 92 || 
|- style="background:#fcf;"
| 72 || March 19 || Los Angeles Kings || 2–5 || 43–23–6 || 92 || 
|- style="background:#ffc;"
| 73 || March 21 || @ Quebec Nordiques || 2–2 OT || 43–23–7 || 93 || 
|- style="background:#cfc;"
| 74 || March 22 || Pittsburgh Penguins || 3–1 || 44–23–7 || 95 || 
|- style="background:#ffc;"
| 75 || March 24 || @ Pittsburgh Penguins || 3–3 OT || 44–23–8 || 96 || 
|- style="background:#cfc;"
| 76 || March 26 || Quebec Nordiques || 3–2 OT || 45–23–8 || 98 || 
|- style="background:#fcf;"
| 77 || March 28 || Detroit Red Wings || 1–5 || 45–24–8 || 98 || 
|-

|- style="background:#cfc;"
| 78 || April 1 || @ Detroit Red Wings || 2–1 || 46–24–8 || 100 || 
|- style="background:#fcf;"
| 79 || April 4 || @ Washington Capitals || 2–3 OT || 46–25–8 || 100 || 
|- style="background:#fcf;"
| 80 || April 5 || New York Islanders || 5–9 || 46–26–8 || 100 || 
|-

|-
| Legend:

Playoffs

|- style="background:#fcf;"
| 1 || April 8 || New York Rangers || 0–3 || Rangers lead 1–0 || 
|- style="background:#cfc;"
| 2 || April 9 || New York Rangers || 8–3 || Series tied 1–1 || 
|- style="background:#cfc;"
| 3 || April 11 || @ New York Rangers || 3–0 || Flyers lead 2–1 || 
|- style="background:#fcf;"
| 4 || April 12 || @ New York Rangers || 3–6 || Series tied 2–2 || 
|- style="background:#cfc;"
| 5 || April 14 || New York Rangers || 3–1 || Flyers lead 3–2 || 
|- style="background:#cfc;"
| 6 || April 16 || @ New York Rangers || 5–0 || Flyers win 4–2 || 
|-

|- style="background:#cfc;"
| 1 || April 20 || New York Islanders || 4–2 || Flyers lead 1–0 || 
|- style="background:#fcf;"
| 2 || April 22 || New York Islanders || 1–2 || Series tied 1–1 || 
|- style="background:#cfc;"
| 3 || April 24 || @ New York Islanders || 4–1 || Flyers lead 2–1 || 
|- style="background:#cfc;"
| 4 || April 26 || @ New York Islanders || 6–4 || Flyers lead 3–1 || 
|- style="background:#fcf;"
| 5 || April 28 || New York Islanders || 1–2 || Flyers lead 3–2 || 
|- style="background:#fcf;"
| 6 || April 30 || @ New York Islanders || 2–4 || Series tied 3–3 || 
|- style="background:#cfc;"
| 7 || May 2 || New York Islanders || 5–1 || Flyers win 4–3 || 
|-

|- style="background:#cfc;"
| 1 || May 4 || Montreal Canadiens || 4–3 OT || Flyers lead 1–0 || 
|- style="background:#fcf;"
| 2 || May 6 || Montreal Canadiens || 2–5 || Series tied 1–1 || 
|- style="background:#cfc;"
| 3 || May 8 || @ Montreal Canadiens || 4–3 || Flyers lead 2–1 || 
|- style="background:#cfc;"
| 4 || May 10 || @ Montreal Canadiens || 6–3 || Flyers lead 3–1 || 
|- style="background:#fcf;"
| 5 || May 12 || Montreal Canadiens || 2–5 || Flyers lead 3–2 || 
|- style="background:#cfc;"
| 6 || May 14 || @ Montreal Canadiens || 4–3 || Flyers win 4–2 || 
|-

|- style="background:#fcf;"
| 1 || May 17 || @ Edmonton Oilers || 2–4 || Oilers lead 1–0 || 
|- style="background:#fcf;"
| 2 || May 20 || @ Edmonton Oilers || 2–3 OT || Oilers lead 2–0 || 
|- style="background:#cfc;"
| 3 || May 22 || Edmonton Oilers || 5–3 || Oilers lead 2–1 || 
|- style="background:#fcf;"
| 4 || May 24 || Edmonton Oilers || 1–4 || Oilers lead 3–1 || 
|- style="background:#cfc;"
| 5 || May 26 || @ Edmonton Oilers || 4–3 || Oilers lead 3–2 || 
|- style="background:#cfc;"
| 6 || May 28 || Edmonton Oilers || 3–2 || Series tied 3–3 || 
|- style="background:#fcf;"
| 7 || May 31 || @ Edmonton Oilers || 1–3 || Oilers win 4–3 || 
|-

|-
| Legend:

Player statistics

Scoring
 Position abbreviations: C = Center; D = Defense; G = Goaltender; LW = Left Wing; RW = Right Wing
  = Joined team via a transaction (e.g., trade, waivers, signing) during the season. Stats reflect time with the Flyers only.
  = Left team via a transaction (e.g., trade, waivers, release) during the season. Stats reflect time with the Flyers only.

Goaltending
  = Left team via a transaction (e.g., trade, waivers, release) during the season. Stats reflect time with the Flyers only.

Awards and records

Awards

Records

Among the team records set during the 1986–87 season was the 26 seconds it took to score the fastest two shorthanded goals in team history on November 6. On November 13, Murray Craven tied the team record for most goals in a single period (3). On November 20, Tim Kerr tied team records for most goals (4) and powerplay goals (3) in a single game. About two weeks later Brian Propp also tied the single game goals record on December 2. Kerr’s .77 goals per game average is a franchise single season high while the team’s 22 shorthanded goals on the season is a team record.

During game two of their division semifinal series against the New York Rangers, the Flyers tied tied the team record for most goals in a single period (5). During game seven of their division final series against the New York Islanders, the Flyers tied a team record for shorthanded goals in a game (2) and set a team record for shorthanded goals during a single period (2, later tied). During game five of the Stanley Cup Finals against the Edmonton Oilers, Propp tied a team record for most assists (4) during a playoff game.

A number of single playoff season team records were set during the 1987 Stanley Cup playoffs. The Flyers set playoff highs for games played (26), wins (15), road wins (8), losses (11), home losses (6), goals scored (85), and goals against (73). Among the skaters setting single season marks were Pelle Eklund for assists (20), Doug Crossman for points by a defenseman (18, later tied), and Propp for shots on goal (104). Rookie Ron Hextall set the goaltending marks for games played (26, tied for the NHL record), wins (15), losses (11), minutes played (1,542), and goals against (71). Hextall’s 43 penalty minutes is a single playoff season NHL record for goaltenders.

Transactions
The Flyers were involved in the following transactions from May 25, 1986, the day after the deciding game of the 1986 Stanley Cup Finals, through May 31, 1987, the day of the deciding game of the 1987 Stanley Cup Finals.

Trades

Players acquired

Players lost

Signings

Draft picks

Philadelphia's picks at the 1986 NHL Entry Draft, which was held at the Montreal Forum in Montreal, Quebec, on June 21, 1986. The Flyers traded their second-round pick, 41st overall, to the Quebec Nordiques for the Nordiques' 1987 second-round pick on June 21, 1986. They also traded their third-round pick, 62nd overall, to the New Jersey Devils for Chico Resch on March 11, 1986, and their fifth-round pick, 104th overall, to the New York Islanders for Mike Murray on June 21, 1986. The Flyers declined to make a selection in the inaugural NHL Supplemental Draft, which was held September 17, 1986.

Farm teams
The Flyers were affiliated with the Hershey Bears of the AHL and the Kalamazoo Wings of the IHL.

Notes

References
General
 
 
 
Specific

1986–87 NHL season by team
1986–87 in American ice hockey by team
1986
1986
1986-87 Philadelphia Flyers season
1987 Stanley Cup
Philadelphia
Philadelphia